Syed Mainul Hossain (5 May 1952 – 10 November 2014) was a Bangladeshi structural engineer and architect. He is the designer of the National Martyrs' Memorial, one of the national landmarks of Bangladesh. He was posthumously awarded the Independence Day Award in 2022.

List of buildings

Buildings on which Hossain was involved with design include:
 National Martyrs' Memorial (1978)
 Bangladesh National Museum (1982)
 Vocational teacher training institute and vocational training institute (1977)
 Bangladesh Bar Council Building (1978)
 Chittagong Export Processing Zone's office building (1980)
 Shilpakala Academy auditorium
 Uttara Model Town (Residential Project) (1985)

Awards and recognition
 Ekushey Padak (1988)
 Sheltech Award (2007)
 Independence Day Award (2022)

Death
Hossain died of a heart attack on 10 November 2014 at the National Institute of Cardiovascular Diseases in Dhaka, at the age of 63. He was buried at the Martyred Intellectuals Memorial in Mirpur.

References 

1952 births
2014 deaths
Bangladesh University of Engineering and Technology alumni
Bangladeshi architects
Bangladeshi civil engineers
Structural engineers
Recipients of the Ekushey Padak
Burials at Martyred Intellectuals Memorial, Dhaka
Recipients of the Independence Day Award